Alighiero di Bellincione  ( 1210–1283) was the father of Dante Alighieri.

Life
Alighiero was born around 1210, the son of Bellincione di Alighiero. He was a member of the Guelph party and was probably a moneylender. Alighiero's first wife was Bella and the couple had one child, Dante, in 1265. After Bella's death, Alighiero married his second wife, Lapa Cialuffi, in 1270 or 1271 and they had two children, Francesco and Gaetana (Tana), who were Dante's half-brother and half-sister, respectively. Alighiero died sometime between 1281 and 1283.

References

1210s births
1280s deaths
Dante Alighieri